The Nokia 6260 slide is a mobile telephone handset produced by Nokia.

Features 
Among its key features are integrated A-GPS with included maps, WLAN, VoIP, a 5.0-megapixel camera with LED flash, WebKit Open Source Browser, Flash Lite 3.0, Bluetooth 2.1 + EDR and MIDP Java 2.1 with additional Java APIs.

Specification sheet

External links
 Nokia 6260 Product page 

Mobile phones introduced in 2008
6260 Slide
Mobile phones with infrared transmitter
Slider phones